Jet Plane and Oxbow is a studio album by the Austin, Texas, band Shearwater. It was released on January 22, 2016, under the Sub Pop label. Jonathan Meiburg has said that he wanted to "...try and make a protest record that wasn't dumb or preachy."

Critical reception

The album has been generally well received. It holds an 82% average rating on Metacritic indicating "universal acclaim."

Track listing

Demos and Outtakes 2013
In a July 19, 2022 Bandcamp post, Jonathan Meiburg advised fans that the demos for Jet Plane and Oxbow had been digitally located and would be accessible to Patreon subscribers for one week. He wrote that the tracks could not be made available on Bandcamp for contractual reasons. No further future release was mentioned, however the wav format files were accompanied by full back and front cover artwork. Four of the songs were developed and included on the album, whilst an additional seven did not survive beyond demo stage. Meiburg: "They're more like sketches than paintings, but you can hear what they're going to be, or might have been."

Charts

References

External links
Shearwater on Sub Pop

2016 albums
Shearwater (band) albums
Sub Pop albums